Erik Magzumuly Asanbayev (Erık Mağzūmūly Asanbaev; 10 March 1936 – 23 August 2004) was a Kazakh statesman and vice-president of the Republic of Kazakhstan from 1991 to 1996.

Biography
Yerik Asanbayev was born on March 10, 1936, in Baigabul village, Amangeldi District, Turgai province. In 1958, he graduated from Kazakh State University majoring in Economics. In 1963, he graduated from Moscow Finance Institute, obtaining a PhD in Economics.

Career

 1959 — 1967 Teaching and working on scientific projects in Moscow and Almaty,
 1963 — head of financial planning department and interbranch balance at the scientific and research institute of economics at State Planning Agency of the Kazakh Soviet Socialist Republic
 1967 — 1986 Council of Ministers of the Kazakh Soviet Socialist Republic and Central Committee of the Communist Party of Kazakhstan
 1986 — 1988 Deputy Head of Department at the Central Committee of the Communist Party of Kazakhstan
 1988 — 1989 Deputy Chairman of the Council of Ministers of Kazakh Soviet Socialist Republic
 1989 — 1990 Secretary of the Central Committee of the Communist Party of the Republic of Kazakhstan and member of Political
 1991 — Chairman of the Supreme Council of Kazakh Soviet Socialist Republic. People's Deputy of the USSR
 December 1991 — February 1996 Vice President of Kazakhstan
 1993 — member of the Security Council of the Republic of Kazakhstan
 1996 — 2000 Extraordinary and Plenipotentiary Ambassador of Kazakhstan to Germany

Awards

 Otan (1995)
 Barys (2000)
 Honor Sign
 Medals

References

External links
Concept of Preservation and Development of Human Civilization

1936 births
2004 deaths
Vice presidents of Kazakhstan
Ambassadors of Kazakhstan to Germany
Al-Farabi Kazakh National University alumni
20th-century musicologists